The Church of Jesus Christ of Latter-day Saints in Mozambique refers to the Church of Jesus Christ of Latter-day Saints and its members in Mozambique.

History

In 1982, Chico Mapenda, who was 13 years old at the time, left Mozambique to study in the German Democratic Republic. In 1989, he came across missionaries there and was baptized on January 14, 1990. Upon the reunification of East and West Germany, he returned to Mozambique. Upon return to Mozambique in 1990, he shared his new believes with his family and friends and held meetings with groups of up to 150 people. 

In February 1996, the LDS Church received legal recognition. In June 1996, Elder Earl C. Tingey of the Seventy visited Beira, organized the Beira group, and authorized the first baptisms in the Country. On January 30, 1999, the Beira Branch was organized. On October 19, 1999, Mozambique was dedicated for the preaching of the gospel. About 650 attended the creation of the Beira Mozambique District on April 13, 2003.

In 2003, there were nine branches in the country. On February 15, 2015, the Maputo Mozambique Stake (Mozambique's first) was created.

Stakes & District

As of February 2023, the following stake and districts exist in Mozambique:

Branches not part of a stake or district:

Mozambique Beira Mission
Marromeu Branch
Matundo Branch
Moatize Branch
Mozambique Beira Mission Branch
Quelimane Branch
Tete Branch
Zambeze Branch

Mozambique Maputo Mission
Homoine Branch
Inhambane Branch
Maxixe Branch
Mozambique Maputo Mission Branch
Xai Xai Branch

The Mozambique Beira Mission Branch and the Mozambique Maputo Mission Branch serves families and individuals in Mozambique that is not in proximity of a meetinghouse.  Congregations not part of a stake are called branches, regardless of size.

Missions

Temples
On April 4, 2021, the intent to construct the Beira Mozambique Temple was announced by church president Russell M. Nelson.

See also
Religion in Mozambique

References

External links
 The Church of Jesus Christ of Latter-day Saints (Africa South) - Official Site
 The Church of Jesus Christ of Latter-day Saints - Mozambique Newsroom (Portuguese)
 ComeUntoChrist.org Latter-day Saints Visitor site

 
Christianity in Mozambique